Michael Browne may refer to:

Michael Browne (cardinal) (1887–1971), Irish cardinal
Michael Browne (bishop of Galway) (1895–1980), Irish bishop of Galway
Michael Browne (Antigua and Barbuda politician), government minister
Michael Browne (Irish politician) (1930–2008), Irish Fine Gael politician from Mayo
Michael Browne (Australian footballer) (born 1954), Australian rules footballer for Collingwood
Michael Browne (rugby league), rugby league footballer for Ireland, and Tallaght Tigers

See also
Michael Brown (disambiguation)
Mick Brown (disambiguation)